Bishop of Nottingham may refer to:
 Bishop of Nottingham (Roman Catholic)
 Anglican Bishop of Nottingham, former suffragan bishop title
 Bishop of Southwell and Nottingham, full diocesan bishop